Ruedi Attinger is a former Swiss curler.

Teams

Private life
Attinger grew up in a family of curlers. His father Peter Sr. is a 1972 Swiss men's champion. His brothers, Peter Jr., Werner, Bernhard and Kurt are curlers too. They won Swiss and European championships and Worlds medals when they played on Peter Jr.'s team. His nephew (Peter Jr.'s son) Felix is a skip of a team that won the Swiss men's silver in 2017 and bronze in 2016; Peter Jr. coached his team. Bernhard's daughter Sandra Ramstein-Attinger is a competitive curler too. She played on three Women's Worlds with teams skipped by Silvana Tirinzoni and Binia Feltscher-Beeli.

References

External links
 
Top-Adresse im Curling

Living people

Swiss male curlers
European curling champions
Swiss curling champions
Year of birth missing (living people)